Phos roseatus is a species of sea snail, a marine gastropod mollusc in the family Nassariidae, the true whelks.

Description

Distribution
This species is distributed in the Red Sea, South Africa, the Mascarene Basin, the Philippines and Australia.

References

External links
 

Nassariidae
Gastropods described in 1844